Ross Park Carousel is a historic carousel located at Binghamton in Broome County, New York.  The carousel is housed in a wooden, one story, 16-sided, pavilion topped by an eight sided cupola.  The carousel has 60 horses standing four abreast, each of which is a "jumper," and two chariots. It was constructed by the Allan Herschell Company and contains its original Wurlitzer #146-A Band Organ.  The carousel was purchased about 1920 and is one of six carousels donated to the citizens of Broome County by George F. Johnson (1857–1948), president of Endicott Johnson Corporation.

It was listed on the National Register of Historic Places in 1992.

Other carousels located in the Greater Binghamton Region:
 C. Fred Johnson Park Carousel
 George F. Johnson Recreation Park Carousel
 George W. Johnson Park Carousel
 Highland Park Carousel
 West Endicott Park Carousel

References

External links

 Visiting information on the Broome County carousels

Buildings and structures in Binghamton, New York
Carousels on the National Register of Historic Places in New York (state)
Amusement rides introduced in 1920
Tourist attractions in Binghamton, New York
National Register of Historic Places in Broome County, New York